
AD 44 (XLIV) was a leap year starting on Wednesday (link will display the full calendar) of the Julian calendar. At the time, it was known as the Year of the Consulship of Crispus and Taurus (or, less frequently, year 797 Ab urbe condita). The denomination AD 44 for this year has been used since the early medieval period, when the Anno Domini calendar era became the prevalent method in Europe for naming years.

Events

By place

Roman Empire 
 Emperor Claudius returns from his British campaign in triumph, the southeast part of Britannia now held by the Roman Empire, but the war will rage for another decade and a half.
 Boudicca marries Prasutagus, king of the British Celtic tribe the Iceni (doubtful).
 Mauretania becomes a Roman province.
 The Isle of Rhodes returns to the Roman Empire. 
 Judaea is controlled by Roman governors.
 (Approximate date, may be as late as 48) A famine takes place in Judea.
 Cuspius Fadus (Roman governor of Judea) suppresses the revolt of Theudas, who is decapitated.

Korea 
 Minjung becomes ruler of the Korean kingdom of Goguryeo.

By topic

Arts and Science 
 Pomponius Mela writes De situ orbis, a geography of the Earth.

Deaths 
 Daemusin, Korean ruler of Goguryeo
 Herod Agrippa I, king of Judea (b. 11 BC)
 James the Great, apostle of Jesus
 Wu Han, general of the Han Dynasty

References 

0044

als:40er#44